The city of Ottawa, Canada, held municipal elections on December 4, 1950.

To date, this election elected the most members of city council in Ottawa history. 28 aldermen from 14 wards, plus 4 controllers and the mayor for a total of 33 on council. Voters overwhelmingly voted to reduce the council down to 18 aldermen in a plebiscite which saw its largest opposition in the more francophone Ottawa and By Wards.

The mayoral race featured the same three candidates as the 1948 race. However, Goodwin defeated Bourque this time. He would only serve for 9 months however, as he died on August 27, 1951. He was replaced by city controller Dr. Charlotte Whitton, the first female controller in city history.

Three new wards were added to council, due to the annexation of parts of Nepean Township and Gloucester Township. Gloucester Ward held a special election on January 2, 1950, while Carleton and Westboro Wards held elections on December 19, 1949.

Mayor of Ottawa

Referendum

Ottawa Board of Control
(4 elected)

Ottawa City Council

(2 elected from each ward)

References
Ottawa Citizen, December 5, 1950

Municipal elections in Ottawa
1950 Ontario municipal elections
1950s in Ottawa
December 1950 events in North America